The Gods of Wheat Street is an Australian television drama series that screened on ABC TV from 12 April 2014. The six-part series tells the stories of the Freeburn clan, an Australian Aboriginal family.

Synopsis
Odin Freeburn, head of the family, is being pulled in all directions as he tries to keep his family together. Odin has one brother in jail, another brother is in love with the daughter of the family enemy and his wife has run away to the city leaving him to raise their two daughters. To complicate matters, his employer has just died, his sister-in-law is in love with him and the spirit of his mother Eden has come back on a mission to protect the important destiny of the Freeburn family line.

Cast

Production
The series is written by Jon Bell, who is also a producer with Lois Randall. Executive producers are Fiona Eagger and Deb Cox from Every Cloud Productions along with Sally Riley, ABC TV's head of Indigenous Unit. It is directed by Catriona McKenzie, Wayne Blair and Adrian Wills. The show was filmed around Casino and Lismore in Northern New South Wales in late 2012.

Episodes

Soundtrack

A soundtrack was recorded and credited to Jeff Lang and released on 12 May 2014. At the APRA Music Awards of 2014, the title track was nominated for Best Television Theme.

Track listing
 "The Gods of Wheat Street" - 1:01
 "Back Where They Belong" - 1:33
 "Together Again" - 3:05
 "Three Weeks Till the Auction" - 1:34
 "Athena in Waiting Room" - 1:15
 "What Happened to You" - 1:36
 "Have You Seen Them Fables" - 1:14
 "Roll Call" - 1:43
 "One Will Be Born, One Will Die" - 1:46
 "Saved By the Cavalry" 2:25
 "Outside Harry's" - 1:20
 "Do You Like What You See" - 2:46
 "Smelling the Shirt" - 1:29
 "The Return of Jonesy Brown" - 0:45
 "We're Never Going Back" - 2:12
 "Jonesy in the Workshop" - 1:19
 "Izzy and the Money" - 1:35
 "What Am I Getting Wrong" - 1:23
 "Who Did This Fables" - 2:44
 "You Mongrel Black Dog" - 1:09
 "I Deserved That Money" - 1:32
 "Odin's Accident" - 4:51
 "Letters In Jail" 1:23
 "Izzy Rushes for the Post" - 1:55
 "Electra Grabs the Taser" - 1:22
 "There's a Surprise Wedding" - 1:43
 "You're My Strong Boy" - 1:03
 "What Happens in Court" - 1:23
 "Rewards Program" - 1:13
 "Going Once Going Twice" - 2:20
 "You've Killed Him" - 1:20
 "If You've Got Something to Say" - 0:59
 "You Still Here" 1:15

References 

Australian Broadcasting Corporation original programming
2013 Australian television series debuts
English-language television shows
Indigenous Australian television series